Connected Earth is a UK network of organizations, primarily museums, that preserve the history of telecommunications in the UK.  Heritage artifacts are physically dispersed to Connected Earth partners and other institutions as appropriate, and are brought together again online through virtual galleries, searchable catalogues and educational resources at its website.

Background 
Connected Earth was founded by BT in 2001 and grew from the company's solution to responsibly discharge its commitment to the UK's telecommunications heritage. By working with respected institutional partners and adopting modern communications technology the UK's telecommunications heritage is both assured for future generations and increasingly accessible.

Partners 
The Connected Earth partners are Amberley Museum and Heritage Centre, Avoncroft Museum of Historic Buildings, BT Archives, Goonhilly Satellite Earth Station, Milton Keynes Museum, Museum of London, Museum of Science and Industry Manchester (MoSI), Porthcurno Telegraph Museum, National Museums of Scotland, the Science Museum and the Institute of Telecommunications Professionals.

Each partner focuses on a different aspect of telecommunications history. Five partners – Amberley, Avoncroft, Goonhilly, Museum of Science and Industry in Manchester and National Museum of Scotland – host dedicated Connected Earth galleries whilst others incorporate Connected Earth artefacts into their existing galleries.

Collecting 
Together the Connected Earth partners tell the history of communications in the UK and from the UK to overseas. Through Connected Earth, artefacts as diverse as Hughes printing telegraph, electrophone table, the tuning coil from Rugby radio station, telephone kiosks, the first transatlantic telegraph cable, are preserved and accessible for all.

Partners continue to collect contemporary communications artefacts and work with other organisations to ensure that the history of communications is preserved.

Through People's Connected Earth, partners also collect stories and memories from the general public and people who worked in the industry.

References  
British Telecommunications plc (2003) Project Profile and Review: Connected Earth The BT Heritage Project 2001-2003

See also 
 BT Museum

External links  
 Connected Earth website 
 People's Connected Earth

BT Group
History of telecommunications in the United Kingdom
Museums in the United Kingdom
Telecommunications museums
2001 establishments in the United Kingdom